Henrietta Jessie Shaw Daley was a Melbourne-based community worker, also known as Jessie. She was born on 17 May 1890.

Education and early life 
Daley went to Presbyterian Ladies' College, Melbourne, and Rosbercon College, Brighton, and graduated in science from the University of Melbourne. Charles Studdy Daley, a civic commissioner, is the husband of Henrietta. Daley had five children.

Career 
Daley was the district commissioner and president of the Girl Guides Association, Vice-President and president of the Canberra Mothercraft Society; Vice-president and the national board of the local branch of the YWCA; and the founder, inaugural president of ACT, National Council of Women.

Honors 
Daley died in 1943 and a room at YWCA, Canberra was named in her honor.

References 

19th-century Australian women
20th-century Australian women
1890 births
1943 deaths
People from Melbourne